Viktor Efremovski (born October 21, 1998) is a Macedonian professional basketball player for KK Gostivar of the Macedonian First League. Efremovski is also a member of the Macedonian national basketball team.

External links
 EuroBasket 
 FIBA Europe 2014

References

1998 births
Living people
Macedonian men's basketball players
People from Gostivar
KK Rabotnički players
KK Vardar players
Shooting guards